Li Zhun (4 July 1928 – 2 February 2000) was a Chinese novelist who was the vice president of China Writers Association and the librarian of Chinese Modern Literature Museum.

Biography
Li was born into an ethnic Mongolian family of teachers in Luoyang, Henan in 1928. His grandfather, Li Zulian, his uncles, Li Mingzhao and Li Mingshan, all were teachers. His father, Li Mingxuan, was a businessman. His mother came from a family of doctors.

In 1934, Li studied at Matun school, by age 6. Then he attended Dade High School, a high school in Changdai Town, Luoyang County.

In 1942, Li fled from famine to Xi'an, Shaanxi.

At the age of 15, Li was an apprentice in a store. Li worked as a postman in Matun Post Office by age 17. Two years later, Li studied Chinese opera in Matun Theatre Troupe.

In 1948, Li worked in Zhongzhou Bank, then he was transferred to Luoyang to teach Chinese.

Li started to publish works in 1953. Li was transferred from Luoyang to Zhengzhou in 1954. In 1955, Li served as a delegate to the National People's Congress.

Li joined the Chinese Communist Party at the age of 32, at the same time, he was appointed the director of China Writers Association.

In 1964, Li served as a delegate to the National People's Congress and a Standing Committee member of the All-China Youth Federation.

In 1966, Mao Zedong launched the Cultural Revolution, he was labeled a "Rightist", he suffered political persecution and experienced mistreatment, then he was sent to Zhoukou to work. Li was rehabilitated by Deng Xiaoping in 1980.

In 1981, Li moved to Beijing. He was appointed the librarian of Chinese Modern Literature Museum in 1990 and the vice president of China Writers Association in 1996.

In 2000, Li died in Beijing.

Works

Novel
 Yellow River Flowing to East

Screenplay
 Li Shuangshuang
 Wang Jieshi
 The Biography of the Old Soldier
 The Great River Flows On
 The Herdsman
 The Qingliang Temple
 The Old Man and the Dog

Awards
 Li Shuangshuang – 2nd Hundred Flowers Awards (1963)
 Wang Jieshi – National Excellent Short Story Award and 5th Golden Rooster Award for Best Writing (1981)
 Yellow River Flowing to East – 2nd Mao Dun Literature Prize

References

1928 births
2000 deaths
Writers from Luoyang
20th-century novelists
Chinese people of Mongolian descent
Mao Dun Literature Prize laureates
Chinese male novelists
20th-century Chinese male writers
Chinese male short story writers
People's Republic of China short story writers
Short story writers from Henan